The South of Scotland District  is a Scottish amateur rugby union team which plays in the amateur Scottish Inter-District Championship. It draws its players from the South of Scotland, mainly the Scottish Borders where there has always been a proud tradition of rugby union. Historically the South team played matches against touring teams visiting Scotland from abroad, and also competed in the Scottish Inter-District Championship. After rugby union became a professional sport in 1995, the team was replaced in 1996 by the new Border Reivers team based in the same geographical area as the South and who wore the same colours as the old team.

When the professional Border Reivers provincial side folded in 1998, the South amateur district was resurrected and renamed Scottish Borders. The team played as Scottish Borders in three seasons of an amateur Scottish Inter-District Championship from 1999 to 2002. However when the amateur district championship was again revived in the 2022-23 season, the team reverted to its old South of Scotland name.

The professional side Border Reivers was resurrected in 2002 to play in the new Celtic League. Unfortunately it folded again in 2007.

The amateur district is still used for the representation of amateur players in the Inter-District Championship; and this amateur championship guides the selection of Scotland Club XV international players.

The South region also plays at age-grade as the Borders side. The region now includes the Scottish Borders and East Lothian. It contributes professional players to the provincial Edinburgh Rugby side.

Early years

The SRU wanted North and South districts to complement its West and East district sides. Happily for them, the Borders were producing fine sides - and rugby union was spreading northwards into Aberdeenshire. It was the provincial clubs though that ultimately forced the Union's hand; led by the arguments of the Aberdeenshire club. Nat Brewis , as honorary secretary of the SRU approved the North-South match in 1880 and sides were named, but owing to the weather the fixture was not played. It was though played the following season.

The first North v South match came off on 31 December 1881; the North winning by 1 goal and 1 try to 2 tries. Along with players from Melrose, Hawick, Roxburgh County, Hawick St. Cuthberts and Galashiels, were players from Paisley and Greenock Wanderers for the South.

The North v South match came off again on 30 December 1882; the North winning by 1 try to nil.

The South played Edinburgh District in December 1890 drawing 2 tries a piece.

South v North 11 December 1909 match report

The South prop Jock Allan was the first married man to play for Scotland in 1934.

Rugby union in the Borders Regions

Borders Rugby has many long and proud traditions. The Border League was the first rugby union league to be set up anywhere in the world, and the South team used to regularly compete against touring sides from the Southern Hemisphere.

Many Borders clubs have helped train and nurture many of Scotland's current internationals.

Touring sides

As many of the Border sides, most notably Melrose, Gala, Hawick, Selkirk and Jed Forest, produced many international players and even Lions, the South proved worthy competition for the touring sides from the Southern Hemisphere. The South twice drew with South African touring sides (1931–32 and 1969–70) and twice beat Australian touring teams (1966–67 and 1984–85).

Attendances at 'South' games often numbered well into the thousands (and a crowd of 10,000 attended the Rest of Scottish Districts versus All Blacks (New Zealand) match in 1972 at Hawick) and before the onset of professionalism, The South would often play touring national sides, such as Australia, New Zealand and South Africa before they played the national side

Scottish Inter-District Championship

The Scottish Inter-District Championship began in season 1953–54.

The South competed in the annual Scottish Inter-District Championship, playing against the district teams of Glasgow District, Edinburgh District, North and Midlands and sometimes Anglo-Scots. The district championship was played in the autumn and provided a level of representative rugby above club competition but below the full Scottish national team. The best performing players were then picked for a large Scotland squad which would form around New Year, ready for the 5 Nations Championship. Often there was a "Red vs Blues" game at Murrayfield to decide the smaller squad.

South v Glasgow 15 October 1968 match preview
South v Glasgow 15 October 1968 match report
South v Glasgow October 1973 preview
South v Glasgow October 1974 preview
South v Glasgow 23 October 1974 match preview

Sevens tournament

The district used to run a Sevens tournament in April.

Effect of professionalism

With the advent of professionalism after 1995, the Scottish Rugby Union realised that not even the best semi-professional Scottish club teams could compete in the new Professional Era in rugby union, which was beginning to gain great momentum in the professional leagues of the Southern Hemisphere and the Northern Hemisphere. In an attempt to stay in touch with the leading nations the Scottish Rugby Union (SRU) formed four professional teams, that would compete in the Heineken Cup and later a new Celtic League. These teams were based on the 4 former District Unions in Scotland, and a team now known as the Border Reivers began playing games in Galashiels and Hawick, the team wore the traditional white and red stripes, favoured by The South for their home games.

For subsequent history of professional teams representing the South of Scotland, see Border Reivers. However, the Border Reivers were amalgamated with Edinburgh to form the Edinburgh Reivers, who later dropped Reivers and are now known simply as Edinburgh Rugby. The Reivers were resurrected as "The Borders" in 2002, only to be disbanded in 2007.

Amateur revival

The South team itself was revived in December 2009 for a game with Northumberland which the South won 37–3 and in the 2011–12 season beat the Barbarians 22–15 at Hawick. It now plays in the revived Amateur Scottish Inter-District Championship.

Renewed hope for a professional rugby team in the Borders came when Sir Moir Lockhead, the Chairman of the SRU, declared in May 2012 that "the Irish model is what we are trying to replicate now". The Irish model has four Provinces, much like the four Districts of Scotland in the early professional years, implying a return for the South/Borders and North/Caledonia.

Rebirth of the amateur district

The South of Scotland District as an amateur district, will return in the 2022–23 Amateur Scottish Inter-District Championship. Its Head Coach will be Matty Douglas, of Hawick, aided by assistant coaches Andrew Clark (Musselburgh), Iain Chisholm (Peebles) and Robert Grigg (Melrose Rugby).

Douglas noted:
It’s great to be given the opportunity to lead the South as Head Coach. The competition is steeped in tradition, and I know how much the South means to a lot of people. To have the Inter-district back gives the top players in the Premiership and National leagues an opportunity to showcase their ability and push for Scotland Club XV selection in the future. We have a great coaching team selected along with a fantastic management team in the background. I know we will all work hard to make sure we give the South the time and effort it deserves.

Honours

The South won the Scottish Inter-District Championship 17 times outright, more than any other District.

In addition, it also shared the Championship with other Districts 10 times.

Season standings

Scottish Inter-District Championship

For the South's professional championship results from 1996 see Border Reivers.

Professional Era

The Amateur Scottish Inter-District Championship has been restarted twice in the professional era. The first restart was from 1999 to 2002; the second restart from the 2022-23 season.

Partial list of games played against international opposition

See also
Rugby union in the Scottish Borders
Border Reivers

References

Scottish rugby union teams
Rugby union in the Scottish Borders
Scottish Inter-District Championship teams
Scottish District sides